Luca Calapai (born 20 May 1993) is an Italian footballer who plays for Crotone in the Italian Serie B.

Club career
Calapai began his professional career within the youth ranks of Arcoiris, before eventually earning call-ups to the first team towards the end of the 2011-12 Serie A campaign, under former coach, Vincenzo Montella. He made his Serie A debut on 13 May 2012, as a 79th-minute substitute in a 0-2 home loss to Udinese.

On 12 July 2012, Calapai was sent out on loan to the Lega Pro Prima Divisione with S.S. Barletta Calcio. He was a first team regular for the club, making 28 appearances and scoring 1 goal during the 2012-13 statistical season. He returned to Catania on 30 June 2013.

On 1 July 2013, Calapai was officially sold to Modena F.C. on a co-ownership deal with Catania.

On 16 July 2018, he rejoined his first club Catania (which was relegated to the third-tier Serie C by then), signing a 4-year contract.

On 25 January 2022, he signed a 1.5-year contract with Serie B club Crotone.

References

External links

Luca Calapai at Full Soccer

1993 births
Sportspeople from Messina
Living people
Italian footballers
Association football defenders
Catania S.S.D. players
A.S.D. Barletta 1922 players
Modena F.C. players
A.C. Carpi players
F.C. Crotone players
Serie A players
Serie B players
Serie C players
Footballers from Sicily